José Maria Pires (March 15, 1919 – August 27, 2017) was a Brazilian bishop of the Roman Catholic Church. Pires was the oldest living Catholic bishop in Brazil at the time of his death at age 98.

Biography 
Pires was born in Córregos, Brazil and was ordained a priest on December 20, 1941. Pires was appointed bishop of the Diocese of Araçuaí on May 25, 1957 and consecrated on September 22, 1957, becoming the first black bishop in the history of Catholic church in Brazil.

On December 2, 1965, Pires was appointed archbishop of the Archdiocese of Paraíba until his retirement on November 29, 1995. He died in Belo Horizonte on 27 August 2017, at the age of 98, due to a respiratory failure caused by pneumonia.

Publishing 
 O grito de milhões de escravas: a cumplicidade do silêncio (1983)
 A cultura religiosa afro-brasileira e seu impacto na cultura universitária (2014)
 Meditações diante da cruz (2015)
 O sacerdote, imagem de Cristo (2016)

References

External links
Catholic Hierarchy
Diocese Site (Portuguese)

1919 births
2017 deaths
20th-century Roman Catholic archbishops in Brazil
Participants in the Second Vatican Council
Roman Catholic bishops of Araçuaí
Afro-Brazilian people
Roman Catholic archbishops of Paraíba